Mazes of Fate is a first-person role-playing video game developed by Argentinian studio Sabarasa and published by Graffiti Entertainment for the Game Boy Advance and the Nintendo DS. The Game Boy Advance version was released in North America on December 12, 2006.

A reconversion, titled Mazes of Fate DS, was released for the Nintendo DS on July 25, 2008 in Europe and on September 9, 2008 in North America. It improved on the original by fixing bugs present in the original, introducing a 3D engine in dungeons as a replacement of fake-3D, adding new secret areas in dungeons, and including new dungeon maps. A major bug in the DS port removed the challenge of combat by making nearly all enemies killable before they can approach the player and start counterattacking.

Plot
The dark fantasy world where the story is set is soon to be facing divine punishment. The ancient gods, disgusted by humanity’s pride, intend to wipe mankind out and replace it with a new, more submissive race of goatmen, but this plan is not unavoidable. One party of adventurers take it upon themselves to fight back "against overwhelming odds" so that humanity is not sentenced to a fate "that may be worse than death."

Traveling with the protagonist are potentially six allies, who gradually get recruited, or ask to join the adventurers.

Gameplay
Mazes of Fate is a real-time first-person role-playing game in which the player takes controls of up to three characters. It bears similarities to older games in its genre, including Eye of the Beholder. When the player starts the game, he or she can either choose from three different pre-generated characters - a Warrior, a Rogue, and a Mage - or create a custom character. The Warrior's abilities are tilted towards power, the Rogue's abilities are tilted towards speed and thief-related abilities, and the Mage's abilities are tilted towards magic and spells. In the DS version of the game, the number of pre-generated characters player may choose from is increased to seven. In addition to the original three characters, he or she can also play as a Priest, an Assassin (an agile warrior using mostly daggers and knives), a Valkyrie (a different type of warrior specializing in two-handed and ranged weapons), or as an alternative type of Warrior specializing in two-handed weapons.The game has three different types of areas the player can explore - dungeons, the overworld, and civilized locations. The dungeons are the primary area where battles are fought, the overworld is a hub which leads to dungeons and civilized locations, and civilized locations often act to advance the story and purchase and sell items.

Reception

The Game Boy Advance version received "mixed" reviews, while the DS version received "generally unfavorable reviews", according to video game review aggregator Metacritic.

Sales were affected by the fact that in 2006, when the game was published the life cycle of the Game Boy Advance was ending since the Nintendo DS was already available.

References

External links 
 
  (Defunct)
 
 

2006 video games
Role-playing video games
Game Boy Advance games
Nintendo DS games
Dungeon crawler video games
Video games developed in Argentina
Neko Entertainment games
Single-player video games